Aberlie House at 122-124 East North Avenue in the Central Northside neighborhood of Pittsburgh, Pennsylvania, was likely built circa 1880.  It was added to the List of City of Pittsburgh historic designations on February 13, 2001.

References

Houses completed in 1880
City of Pittsburgh historic designations
Houses in Pittsburgh